Piratininga is a municipality (município) in the state of São Paulo (state) in Brazil. The population is 13,765 (2020 est.) in an area of 402 km².

References

Municipalities in São Paulo (state)